Bywell Bridge is a 19th-century stone bridge across the River Tyne. It is a Grade II listed building.

History
The bridge was opened in 1838. It was built at a cost of £15,000, which was paid  by the local landowner T W Beaumont. The designer was the architect George Basevi.  The bridge joins Bywell and the adjoining roads with Stocksfield. It is of ashlar masonry, with five segmental arches crossing the river, and two flood arches, without parapets, to the south.

The remains of the piers of an ancient bridge, believed to be Roman, stood nearby until demolished on Beaumont's instructions when work on the present bridge began.

References

External links
 

Bridges in Northumberland
Crossings of the River Tyne
George Basevi buildings
Grade II listed bridges
Grade II listed buildings in Northumberland
Bridges completed in 1838
Bridge